Ståle Slettebø (born 21 August 1964) is a retired Norwegian football midfielder.

He came through the youth ranks of Drøbak-Frogn IL, making his senior debut in the early 1980s. He also represented Norway as a youth international. In 1994 he moved on to second-tier club Stabæk IF, securing promotion and also playing for them in the 1995 Tippeligaen. He got 37 league games and 6 cup games for Stabæk  before retiring from football.

References

1964 births
Living people
People from Frogn
Norwegian footballers
Drøbak-Frogn IL players
Stabæk Fotball players
Norwegian First Division players
Eliteserien players
Association football midfielders
Norway youth international footballers
Sportspeople from Viken (county)